THC morpholinylbutyrate (SP-111, Δ9-THC-O-[4-(morpholin-4-yl)butyrate]) is a synthetic derivative of tetrahydrocannabinol, developed in the 1970s. It is a prodrug which is converted into THC inside the body, and was one of the first derivatives of THC that is able to form water-soluble salts, giving it a significant advantage over THC for some applications. However, it is less potent than THC and the metabolic conversion to THC is relatively slow and variable, giving it unpredictable pharmacokinetics which has limited its research applications.

See also 
 THC-O-acetate
 THC-O-phosphate
 THC hemisuccinate
 Nabitan
 O-1057

References 

Benzochromenes
Cannabinoids
4-Morpholinyl compunds